Maya the Bee: The Honey Games is a 2018 computer-animated comedy adventure film directed by Noel Cleary, Sergio Delfino & Alexs Stadermann. Loosely based on characters from the 1975 anime Maya the Honey Bee and the German children's book The Adventures of Maya the Bee by Waldemar Bonsels, the film is a sequel to the 2014 film Maya the Bee and stars the original voice cast reprising their roles from the first film, with newcomers including Rupert Degas.

Released theatrically on 1 April 2018 in Germany, the film grossed $10.8 million worldwide. A sequel, titled Maya the Bee: The Golden Orb, was released on 7 January 2021.

Plot

Maya's hive is abuzz with excitement as the summer harvest is now over, but with little results. Just then, a royal messenger and master of the Honey Games, Master Beegood, steps in and announces that after many years of being uninvited, they're finally allowed to compete in the Honey Games in the city of Buzztropolis. Though everyone is at first thrilled, there is a slight catch: the hive must contribute half of their honey for the athletes' health. Maya is surprisingly shocked in disbelief, but as the Queen hesitates for a moment, Beegood warns her not to reject the offer, and she therefore accepts the invitation, regardless of the consequences.

Soon after, Maya and Willy decide to take matters into their own hands, and they fly to the thriving hive of Buzztropolis, where upon arrival Maya bumps into one of the competitors called Violet, who is later revealed to be Beegood's daughter. As both bees greet the Empress, Maya explains that if the honey is all that matters, then why can't her hive join in the Games? Unfortunately, as they make a deal, Willy spills the honey onto the Empress and Maya's incident is witnessed by the Queen. Later, both royals confide in one another about what happened in the throne room. As Maya insists that the Empress reconsider the decision, she makes a wager: if Maya's team wins, all is forgiven, but if they lose, the Empress will steal all of the hive's honey. Maya agrees, even though the Queen is reluctant of what may happen.

On the opening of the games, Maya is met by her team; Spinder, a spider, Craig, a germaphobic cockroach, Bedford, a bed bug, and Arnie and Barney, the ant soldiers, all of which are untrained and unskilled, much to Maya's disappointment. On day one of the games, the teams are tasked with a simple game of dodgeball. Things get off to a shaky start as Maya's team are easily beaten, but as the challenge progresses, the fellow competition is having a fair bit of trouble, too. At the end of the task, the results reveal that Team Tropolis (Violet's team) came first, but Team Poppy Meadow (Maya's team) haven't placed last.

Later that evening, Violet invites Willy and Maya over to dine with her, but Maya is taunted and bullied by Violet as she keeps calling her a "meadow bug". Violet then frames Maya for smashing her hand and being mean to her. Beegood warns Maya that she will be expelled from the games if she creates any further harm. Infuriated, Maya flies off to be alone, though Willy reassures her that they're still best friends.

On day two, the teams are tasked with climbing the vines of a willow tree, and reach their colored flag at the top, as a team. As some of the teams get off to an early start, Violet's team tries their best to reach their goal, whereas on the other hand, Maya is desperate to win the challenge, and abandons her teammates. As both team captains reach their goals, it is revealed that Violet and her team came SECOND and Maya's team placed in third place. Unfortunately, she is rejected by the team due to her selfishness and lack of leadership. Violet apologizes to Beegood for not winning, and is reminded by her father not to disappoint again. Later, Maya returns to camp and finds out that the team now knows why she has to win, as Willy previously mentioned. They wonder why she didn't say anything, and she replies that she was afraid that they would worry too much. However, the team finds out that they need just a little training and as the afternoon passes, they are finally ready for the next challenge.

On the last day, the final three teams are challenged with navigating through a maze, without waking the tortoise in the center and are also required to not fly in this task. As the teams get going, Maya and her team manage to tie a string of Spindler's silk so that they can follow the way. Meanwhile, Violet and her team are caught in a dead end and after a brief argument about where they're supposed to go, Violet is run over by the giant tortoise that Willy inadvertently awoke. As Maya's team wins, the rest of Violet's team come second, disappointing both Violet and her father. Both the Empress (angered by the result) and the Queen (happy of the result) prepare for the final showdown.

The night before the final showdown, Violet and Maya confront each other and dare to do a duel down a big hill covered with thorns called Sluggy Hill. Confident, Maya accepts, unaware that Violet is secretly doing another trick on her again. As they race, Violet stops before the finish line, whereas Maya passes it and accidentally knocks over the Honey Cup, Violet frames her again for breaking the honey cup on purpose. Beegood is furious by the chaos and damage Maya has caused, and expels her from the Honey Games. Saddened once again by the Violet's bullying, she flies away, devastated. Shortly after, Flip talks to her and explains why she has been neglecting the team: she is so caught up in trying to save the hive, that she hasn't been leading nor communicating with her teammates. Inspired, Maya thanks Flip for the advice and buzzes off to camp.

After reconciling with Willy and the team, Maya decides to up her game and knows what to do during tomorrow. As the big day dawns, the Empress, the Queen, and everyone else is gathered in the arena for the last showdown. At first, Maya's team apparently enter without Maya, much to the Queen's confusion and the Empress's appreciation of Maya would never compete the games. Suddenly, Maya flies in and requests for a second chance, regarding to her inexcusable behavior. The Empress gives her permission to continue competing, much to Beegood's dismay. Desperate that Maya should lose, he tells Violet to take a shortcut along the route in order to win.

The race begins, with Maya and Violet's teams neck and neck. But Willy once again gets separated from the team and follows what appears to be Maya going into a bush with a shortcut. Violet instructs Willy to fake an injury in order for his team to slow down, to which he refuses to do, and accuses her of cheating. And so, Maya's team successfully find the pollen of a purple flower. Meanwhile, Violet and her team are surrounded by a spider called Thekla. Just as both teams are about to be eaten, Bedford lullabies the spider to sleep with his talented singing. As they rescue their rivals, Violet has a change of heart and guiltily apologizes to Maya for her bullying and for cheating. Maya reminds Violet that having a team means having new friends.

Both teams make a last sprint for the finish, and Violet's team stops before the finish line as they helped Maya and her team cross it and are crowned the winners. However, the Empress is aghast as to why this is as it has been. Violet betrays her father and explains to everyone with deep regret that she cheated during the challenge, but Maya rescued her. Before making an example of Maya, the Empress is cut off by the Queen who stands up to her and tells her that enough is enough, and she should accept the fact that the right team won. The Empress finally sees reason and declares that Maya's team wins and also forgives her for her actions.

At the after-party, everyone is dancing and enjoying the party, whereas Violet and Maya dance with Willy happily.

Cast
Coco Jack Gillies as Maya, a young bee girl
Benson Jack Anthony as Willy, Maya's best friend, he was voiced by Kodi Smit-McPhee in the first film.
Richard Roxburgh as Flip, a grasshopper
Justine Clarke as The Queen, She was voiced by Miriam Margolyes in the first film.
Jimmy James Eaton as Crawley, the Queen's assistant, He was voiced by Noah Taylor in the first film.
Marney McQueen as The Empress, The Queen's sister, the former sole antagonist
Rupert Degas as Beegood, Violet's father and the main antagonist.
Linda Ngo as Violet, Maya's former rival and Willy's brief love interest, and the secondary antagonist.
Stavroula Adameitis as Chelsea, Violet's friend
Tess Meyer as Sandra, Violet's friend
Cam Ralph as Bedford, a bed bug
Shane Dundas as Barney, an army ant
David Collins as Arnie, an army ant
Jordan Hare as Spinder, a spider
Jimmy James Eaton as Craig, a cockroach
Jane Ubrien as Thekla, a spider
Peter McAllum as Mantis, owner of the honey games
Sam Haft as Drago, a dragonfly

Sequel

A third film titled Maya the Bee 3: The Golden Orb was released on January 7, 2021 in Australia directed by Noel Cleary and produced by Tracy Lenon and Benjamin Ey. The film was originally scheduled to be released in 2020. But it was pushed back to 2021 due to the COVID-19 pandemic.

When Maya, a headstrong little bee, and her best friend Willi, rescue an ant princess they find themselves in the middle of an epic bug battle that will take them to strange new worlds and test their friendship to its limits.

References

External links

 
 

2018 films
StudioCanal films
StudioCanal animated films
Flying Bark Productions films
Maya the Bee
Australian animated feature films
Australian children's animated films
Australian children's comedy films
Australian children's adventure films
Australian computer-animated films
Animated films about insects
German animated films
2010s Australian animated films
2010s German animated films
2010s children's animated films
2010s children's comedy films
2010s children's adventure films
2018 comedy films
2018 computer-animated films
Fictional ants
Fictional grasshoppers
Films about bees
Films about royalty
2010s English-language films
2010s American films
2010s British films
2010s German films